Benjamín Vicuña Luco (born 29 November 1978) is a Chilean actor and entrepreneur.

Biography
Vicuña was born November 29, 1978 to father Juan Pablo Vicuña Parot and mother Isabel Luco Morandé. He is a descendant of Benjamín Vicuña Mackenna, a Chilean historian and politician of Basque and Irish descent. He studied theatre at the University of Chile.

Vicuña founded the Centro Mori and has been appointed as a "goodwill ambassador" of UNICEF Chile in 2008.

Vicuña was in a relationship with Argentine model Carolina Ardohain from 2005 to 2015, and the couple has four children together; one daughter, Blanca (2006-2012) and three sons, Bautista (born in 2008), Beltrán (born in 2012) and Benicio (born in 2014). He has been in a relationship with Argentine actress China Suárez since 2015, and the couple has two children together: daughter Magnolia (born in 2018) and son Amancio (born in 2020).

Filmography

Television

Awards

Nominations
 2013 Martín Fierro Awards
 Best actor of daily drama

References

External links

 

1978 births
Chilean male film actors
Chilean male telenovela actors
Chilean male television actors
Chilean people of Basque descent
Chilean people of Irish descent
Living people
Male actors from Santiago
University of Chile alumni
Benjamin Vicuña Luco
Benjamin